Toddington Services is a motorway service station on the M1 motorway between junctions 11A and 12, just north of Luton and Dunstable in Bedfordshire, England. It takes its name from the nearby village of Toddington. It is owned by Moto Hospitality.

History
Toddington Services partially opened at Whitsun in the spring of 1964; the rest of the main 800-seat restaurant opened in early 1965. The section of M1 it is on opened in November 1959. When opened, it was the first service area on the journey north from London on the M1, and the UK's largest. It was the UK's eighth motorway service station, and the M1's third service area; the M1 had the UK's first two motorway service areas.

It was Granada Motorway Services's first motorway service area; its next would be Frankley in the north of Worcestershire on the M5 in 1966.  Granada Motorway Services Ltd (now called Moto Motorway Services) was incorporated on 28 August 1962. From January 2001 to September 2006 it was known as Compass Motorway Services.

Other Granada services further up the M1 were Trowell in Nottinghamshire and Woolley Edge in West Yorkshire. By the end of the 1980s Granada had twenty motorway service areas, being headquartered at Toddington.

Structure
Around one mile south, on the western side of the M1, is the large Sundon Substation in Chalton, a terminus of many pylon lines of the National Grid. The eastern side of the car park (trucks) is underneath a 275kV pylon line, which terminates at Sundon. Around 300 metres to the east is the Midland Main Line, between Harlington railway station (to the north) and Leagrave railway station (to the south). The site is accessed off the motorway via a private road from the B530, which connects to junction 12 (A5120, for Flitwick and Woburn) to the north. The Icknield Way passes east-west north and south of the site.

Moto Hospitality, which operates 58 motorway service stations, is actually headquartered at the southbound site.

The first M&S Simply Food at a Moto site opened at Toddington in 2003.

In popular culture
As a location in the 1972 film Fear In the Night.

In the last episode of BBC's Knowing Me Knowing You radio series in 1993, Alan Partridge's last guest dies on air. Partridge decides to observe a minute's silence, but realises - as it is radio - that a minute of 'dead air' is impossible. He therefore intersperses the silence with an occasional utterance. Thus he suggests to listeners on the road to pull off and join in the minute's silence. He even goes as far as naming a few service stations where they can park their cars. One of them is Toddington. In episode two of the television series Knowing Me Knowing You Partridge introduces his guest Daniella Forrest (Minnie Driver) with another reference to Toddington: "So, now, my first guest is intelligent, witty, a woman of the world with a figure that would stop the traffic dead, both ways on the M1 if she were to wiggle across the footbridge at Toddington Service Station."

In 2004, Toddington Services featured in series 4, episode 3 of Top Gear with the three presenters comparing a Volvo 760, Audi 80 and Rover 416GTi before proceeding up the M1 and M6 to Old Trafford.

References

External links
Moto official website — Toddington
Motorway Services Online — Toddington
Motorway Services Guide — Toddington

1964 establishments in England
M1 motorway service stations
Buildings and structures in Bedfordshire
Central Bedfordshire District
Commercial buildings completed in 1964
Economy of Bedfordshire
Moto motorway service stations
Transport in Bedfordshire